Guard is a 2019 Russian thriller drama film directed by and starring Yuri Bykov. The film was released in Russia on October 24, 2019.

Plot 
The regular life of the caretaker of an abandoned sanatorium is disrupted by the arrival of a strange couple who ask to stay in one of the rooms. Stas and Vera (couple) often quarrel and shout at each other; you can understand that they are hiding from someone. In the evening, three men approach the sanatorium and set fire to a wooden arbor. They call the Watchman, pour gasoline over him, and threaten to burn him for everything he once did. Then they leave. Vera brings alcohol from the city and drinks every day. One evening, she tells the watchman that her two-year-old son had recently died s, after which Stas fled from his criminal colleagues and removing money belonging to the whole group from all accounts.

All three of them have something to hide and something to hide from in the snowy wilderness.

Cast 
 Yuriy Bykov as Vlad, guard
 Vladislav Abashin as Stas
  as Vera
  as father
  as son
 Artur Beschastny as Bogatov
 Aleksandr Kuzmin as  Bagor

Filming
The filming was announced in November 2018, and it was initially assumed that the role of the Watchman would be played by Kirill Pirogov.

The film was shot at the Sosnovy Bor sanatorium in Solotcha is an exclave neighborhood within the Sovetsky District of the city of Ryazan.

Release
The film premiered on October 18, 2019 in Moscow. The film was released in wide rental on October 24, 2019. It is noteworthy that at the same time as the premiere in cinemas, the film appeared on the Kinopoisk service, since Yandex.Studio is the co-producer of the film.

References

External links 
 

2019 films
2010s Russian-language films
2019 thriller drama films
Russian thriller drama films
Films directed by Yuri Bykov
2019 drama films